Swainsonia fissurata, common name : the reticulate mitre, is a species of sea snail, a marine gastropod mollusk in the family Mitridae, the miters or miter snails.

Description
The shell size varies between 21 mm and 65 mm.

Distribution
This species occurs in the Red Sea and in the Indian Ocean off East Africa and the Mascarene Basin.

References

 Vine, P. (1986). Red Sea Invertebrates. Immel Publishing, London. 224 pp.
 Drivas, J. & M. Jay (1988). Coquillages de La Réunion et de l'île Maurice
 Cernohorsky W. O. (1991). The Mitridae of the world (Part 2). Monographs of Marine Mollusca 4. page(s): 126
 Poppe G.T. & Tagaro S.P. (2008). Mitridae. pp. 330–417, in: G.T. Poppe (ed.), Philippine marine mollusks, volume 2. Hackenheim: ConchBooks. 848 pp.

External links
 

Mitridae
Gastropods described in 1811